Nerve is an American, New York based band, founded by the drummer Jojo Mayer.

History 
From the 1990s, Jojo Mayer participated actively in party events called "Prohibited Beatz" which was a platform for experimental interaction with DJ's and many kind of artists. The band Nerve initially emerged from these parties, described as an "endeavor in reverse engineering the textures and rhythms of the current stream of computer generated music into a live performed, improvisational format". While the line-up of musicians in Nerve was initially fluid, it solidified in the early 2000s around Jojo Mayer, Takuya Nakamura, John Davis and Roli Mosimann, and then again in 2014 around Mayer, Davis, Jacob Bergson and Aaron Nevezie.

In 2016, Schweizer Radio und Fernsehen produced and televised a documentary film which chronicles several Nerve concerts in Zurich, London, Tokyo and Hong Kong, and which features interview footage with Mayer and others pertaining to the origins and history of Nerve.

With the current lineup of Mayer, Davis, Bergson and Nevezie, Nerve has maintained a constant touring schedule across the United States, Europe, Asia and Canada.

Personnel

Current line-up
 Jojo Mayer : drums
 John Davis : bass
 Jacob Bergson : keyboards
 Aaron Nevezie : programming

Former members
 Janek Gwizdala : bass
 Takuya Nakamura : synthesizers
 Roli Mosimann : real-time audio deconstruction

Discography
 2007 - Prohibited Beats
 2010 - EP1
 2010 - EP2
 2011 - EP3
 2011 - The Distance Between Zero And One
 2012 - EP4
 2014 - EP5
 2015 - Live in Europe
 2015 - Ghosts of Tomorrow
 2016 - Vocal Collaborations
 2017 - Nerve
 2018 - After the Flare
 2019 - Music for Sharks

References

External links
Official Band Website
Jojo Mayer Official Website

Musical groups from New York (state)